Fool's Mate is the debut solo album by Peter Hammill of progressive rock band Van der Graaf Generator. The title is both a chess and tarot reference. It was produced by Trident Studios' in-house producer John Anthony. The album was recorded in 1971, in the midst of one of Van der Graaf Generator's most prolific periods. Hammill used the album to record a backlog of songs which were much shorter and simpler than his Van der Graaf Generator material, and declared on the original album sleeve: "This isn't intended to be any kind of statement of my present musical position, but at the same time, it is an album which involves a great deal of me, the person, basically a return to the roots."

Guest musicians on the album included the members of Van der Graaf Generator, members of his label mates Lindisfarne, and guitarist Robert Fripp.

Fool's Mate includes one of Hammill's most celebrated love songs, "Vision", which he still performs in concert. Both "Vision" and "The Birds" were re-worked for Hammill's 1984 album The Love Songs.

In 2005 Fool's Mate was issued in remastered form by EMI Virgin Records, supplemented with bonus demo recordings of several songs.

Cover art
The cover was designed by Paul Whitehead who at the time was the favourite cover artist for Van der Graaf Generator and fellow Charisma band Genesis.

Reception

The UK music press was generally very positive about Fool's Mate. Melody Maker saw it as "one of THE albums of the year".

Paul Stump, in his History of Progressive Rock, called Fool's Mate "a revamped corpus of pre-Van der Graaf Generator and pre-university songs of plumptious psychedelic pop hedging its bets between Syd Barrett and Al Stewart." He remarked that some of the songs seem more like "warm-up exercises" for longer, better works, but he found the tunes "Summer Song in Autumn" and "Sunshine" very catchy and pleasing, and praised the "spine-tingling" three-part organ chord which concludes the album.

Track listing
All tracks composed by Peter Hammill, except for songs with asterisks, which are by Hammill and Chris Judge Smith.

Bonus tracks on 2005 reissue:
"Re-Awakening" (early demos) – 4:37
"Summer Song (In The Autumn)" (early demos) – 2:50
"The Birds" (early demos) – 3:23
"Sunshine" (early demos) – 3:54
"Happy" (early demos) – 2:49

Personnel
Adapted from liner notes.
Guy Evans – drums, percussion (1, 3, 6, 7, 9, 11)
Martin Pottinger – drums (1, 2, 4, 10)
Hugh Banton – piano, organ (1, 3, 5–9, 11)
Rod Clements – bass, violin (2, 4, 10)
Nic Potter – bass (1, 3, 6–9, 11)
Ray Jackson – harp, mandolin (2, 4, 10)
David Jackson – alto and tenor saxophones, flute (1, 3, 6–8, 10)
Robert Fripp – electric guitar (1, 7, 8, 10–12)
Paul Whitehead – tam tam (10)
Peter Hammill – all lead vocals (1-12); acoustic guitar, piano (1-4, 6–10, 12)
Fluctuating Chorale: Guy, Hugh, Dave, Ray, John, Norman, Alastair, John, Peter

Technical
John Anthony – producer
Robin Cable – engineer (Trident Studios, London)
Paul Whitehead – artwork
Sebastian Rich – photography

References

External links
 Album information on the unofficial VdGG site

Peter Hammill albums
1971 debut albums
Charisma Records albums
Albums produced by John Anthony (record producer)
Albums recorded at Trident Studios